The 2012 Port Huron Patriots season is the first season for the Continental Indoor Football League (CIFL) franchise.
After the disappointing end to the Port Huron Predators season in 2011, Dave and Cyndi Kinsman wanted to bring back a team to Port Huron in 2012 and the future. Kinsman stated, "We are aware of the history of teams in this city and the bottom line is that you have to win on and off the field to make this succeed. Other teams could win on the field, but couldn't win off the field meaning they didn't have the front office and leadership it takes to succeed. We are confident in the direction this franchise will head and we are thrilled to be in Port Huron." The team announced that they would be playing at McMorran Arena. In early September 2011, the Patriots signed former Pradators head coach John Forti, as well as re-signed local players who had played for the Predators. 
On December 24, 2011 the team announced its training camp roster.

On February 11, 2012, the team played its first ever preseason game. They defeated the outdoor semi-professional Southern Michigan Timberwolves 35-21. This first unofficial win came in the wake of the tragic loss of Offensive Lineman Ken Hamilton, who was killed in a shooting outside of a Detroit nightclub. Teammate Antonio Martin was also injured in the shooting.

On March 29, 2012, Kinsman fired the entire coaching staff consisting of Head Coach/Offensive Coordinator John Forti, Defensive Coordinator Ron Gadowski, Special Teams and Line Coach Ryan Nolin and Defensive Backs Coach Jude Carter. Kinsman named himself the head coach of the Patriots and hired the coaching staff from the Michigan Gators, a semi-professional team that the Patriots had played in the preseason.

Kinsman's decision to make himself the head coach did not sit well with some of the players, as a group, led by Terry Mitchell, left the team due to Kinsman's lack of football coaching experience.

Kinsman went on to lead the Patriots to a 3-4 record, making them 4-6 overall, clinching the 4th seed in the CIFL playoffs, but despite this factor, the league decided to shorten the playoffs. This left the Patriots and the Evansville Rage both out of the playoffs.

Players

Signings

Final roster

Schedule

Preseason

Regular season

Standings

Regular season results

Week 1: vs Chicago Vipers

In the first ever regular season game for the Vipers and Patriots, it was a tale of two halves. The Patriots started the scoring on an 8-yard run by Tracey McIntyre less than two minutes into the game followed by a 39-yard pass from Darryl Johnson to Jose Morris to grab a 14-0 Patriot lead. Chicago answered on a 4-yard touchdown run by Bill Ziemba, but the Patriots extended their lead to 20-7 as Johnson and McIntyre hooked up for a 25-yard touchdown pass. Chicago quarterback Anthony Kropp added a 1-yard touchdown run and Port Huron capped the first quarter scoring on a 19-yard touchdown pass from Johnson to Morris. The Patriots' first points of the second quarter came from a safety when the snap was over the head of Kropp and recovered by the Vipers in the end zone. Darryl Johnson threw his fourth touchdown of the half on a 7-yard pass to Dan Johnson. The Patriots added an 11-yard touchdown run by McIntyre to close the first half scoring. The Vipers outscored the Patriots 21-6 in the third quarter and pull within 11, trailing 46-35. The third quarter scoring was started by Chicago, who on a 12-yard pass from Kropp to Dan Carter. Port Huron quarterback Johnson added a 3-yard touchdown run to keep the Patriot lead at 25. The next four scores in the game belonged to the Vipers. Kropp threw another touchdown pass to Dominique Jackson, this one 27 yards, and Khyree Copeland added a touchdown run from 22 yards to end the third quarter. The 11-point lead heading into the fourth quarter quickly disappeared as defensive back Lawrence Harvey intercepted Johnson and returned it for a 13-yard touchdown. Just 30 seconds into the final quarter and the lead was trimmed to four. The Vipers took their first lead of the game as Johnson completed a pass to Dominique Jackson at the Port Huron 16. Jackson fumbled the football and it was picked up by Dan Carter at the 5-yard line and taken in for a touchdown. Julie Harshbarger added the extra point and Chicago led 49-46. The game winning score came with just over two minutes to play as Mark Carter scored from 1 yard out to put the Patriots up 52-49. Chicago had one last chance to tie the game, but Harshbarger's kick was no good as time expired.

With the win, the Patriots improved to 1-0.

Week 2: vs Dayton Silverbacks

Dayton opened the scoring first with Evan Sawyer taking the ball in from 1 yard out. The PAT was kicked by Zack VanZant and the Silverbacks led 7-0. The Patriots came right back down the field and scored on 4-yard run by Tracey McIntyre with 5:52 left in the opening stanza. Mark Carter ran in the two-point conversion and the host led 8-7. Dayton took the next possession and moved down the field and answered the call with touchdown with 1:47 left in the quarter. Sawyer passed the ball to Bruce Peters from seven yards out, and VanZant added the PAT. At the end of the first quarter, Dayton led 14-8.

With 9:59 left in the first half, VanZant kicked a 16-yard field goal. With 5:45 left in the half, Sawyer threw a 25-yard touchdown pass to Antwain Weeden. The extra point was good and they led 24-8. Port Huron answered the bell when Terry Michell caught a 6-yard pass from Michael McKinley, but Carson Nowakowski's kick was no good. Weeden took the ensuing kickoff and ran 52 yards for a touchdown to close the half, but the PAT failed. At halftime, Dayton led 30-14.

Darryl Johnson threw a 14-yard pass to Jose Morris to open up the second half scoring. Port Huron went for two points and failed. Dayton then came back and scored with 4 minutes left in the quarter when Sawyer threw a 44 yards pass to Tyler Waller. The third quarter ended and the Silverbacks led 36-22.

In the fourth quarter, Dayton added two touchdowns to close out the scoring and win the game 50-22.

With the loss, the Patriots fell to 1-1.

Week 3: vs Evansville Rage

With the loss, the Patriots fell to 1-2.

Week 4: vs Dayton Silverbacks

After the team saw the entire coaching staff, quarterback and a kicker change, the Patriots went on the road for their first road game in franchise history against the undefeated Dayton Silverbacks. New quarterback Torrance Webster threw a pair of touchdowns to Jose' Cannon, and ran in another score. New kicker Chris Kolias was 1 for 2 on field goal attempts, and 3 for 3 in extra point attempts. In the end, it was Webster's three interceptions that cost the Patriots the game, as the final one was taken back 40 yards by Melvin Thomas to ultimately seal the win for the Silverbacks.

With the loss, the Patriots fell to 1-3.

Week 5: vs Indianapolis Enforcers

With the win, the Patriots improved to 2-3

Week 6: vs Saginaw Sting

The Sting came into the game with a 3-0 record and were facing Port Huron for the first of two consecutive weeks playing each other for the rights to the "Michigan Cup." The Sting went on to defeat the Patriots by a score of 49-35. Saginaw's Tommy Jones led the way for the Sting, throwing six touchdowns.

With the loss, the Patriots fell to 2-4

Week 7: vs Saginaw Sting

With the loss, the Patriots fell to 2-5.

Week 8: vs Indianapolis Enforcers

The Patriots won an unusual game, as a majority of the Enforcers players decided not to travel with the team and they were forced to dress Port Huron players who were inactive for the game. The Patriots won, 62-8.

With the win, the Patriots improved to 3-5.

Coaching staff

References

2012 Continental Indoor Football League season
Port Huron Patriots
Port Huron Patriots